Kim Dong-myung (born 5 August 1985) is a Korean handball player for Doosan and the Korean national team.

He represented Korea at the 2019 World Men's Handball Championship.

References

1985 births
Living people
Korean male handball players